John Handy (born 1933) is American jazz alto saxophonist from Texas.

John Handy may also refer to:
 John C. Handy (1844–1891), Tucson physician and surgeon
 Captain John Handy (1900–1971), American jazz alto saxophonist from Mississippi
 John Killeen Handy (politician) (1834–1874), Australian Queensland politician
 John W. Handy (born 1944), United States Air Force general

See also
 Jack Handey (born 1949), American comedian